Alice is a city in Cass County, North Dakota, United States. The population was 41 at the 2020 census.

History
Alice was laid out and platted in 1900 when the railroad was extended to that point. The name Alice was bestowed in honor of the wife of North Dakota Lieutenant Governor R. S. Lewis. A post office was established at Alice in 1901, and remained in operation until it was discontinued in 1995.

John Steinbeck mentioned visiting Alice in Travels with Charley.

Geography

Demographics

2010 census
As of the census of 2010, there were 40 people, 18 households, and 13 families living in the city. The racial makeup of the city was 100.0% White.

There were 18 households, of which 27.8% had children under the age of 18 living with them, 55.6% were married couples living together, 5.6% had a female householder with no husband present, 11.1% had a male householder with no wife present, and 27.8% were non-families. 27.8% of all households were made up of individuals, and 11.1% had someone living alone who was 65 years of age or older. The average household size was 2.22 and the average family size was 2.62.

The median age in the city was 45.5 years. 22.5% of residents were under the age of 18; 12.5% were between the ages of 18 and 24; 15% were from 25 to 44; 27.5% were from 45 to 64; and 22.5% were 65 years of age or older. The gender makeup of the city was 60.0% male and 40.0% female.

2000 census
As of the census of 2000, there were 56 people, 23 households, and 18 families living in the city. The population density was 57.9 people per square mile (22.3/km2). There were 25 housing units at an average density of 25.8 per square mile (10.0/km2). The racial makeup of the city was 98.21% White, and 1.79% from two or more races.

There were 23 households, out of which 21.7% had children under the age of 18 living with them, 78.3% were married couples living together, and 21.7% were non-families. 17.4% of all households were made up of individuals, and 4.3% had someone living alone who was 65 years of age or older. The average household size was 2.43 and the average family size was 2.78.

In the city, the population was spread out, with 16.1% under the age of 18, 10.7% from 18 to 24, 16.1% from 25 to 44, 41.1% from 45 to 64, and 16.1% who were 65 years of age or older. The median age was 48 years. For every 100 females, there were 133.3 males. For every 100 females age 18 and over, there were 147.4 males.

The median income for a household in the city was $35,750, and the median income for a family was $36,750. Males had a median income of $26,250 versus $18,750 for females. The per capita income for the city was $13,753. None of the population and none of the families were below the poverty line.

References

External links

 Alice, North Dakota diamond jubilee, June 6-7, 1975 : 1900-1975 from the Digital Horizons website

Cities in Cass County, North Dakota
Cities in North Dakota
Populated places established in 1900
1900 establishments in North Dakota